The 1916 Buffalo High School, also known as Buffalo-Tower City Senior High School, is a property in Buffalo, North Dakota that was listed on the National Register of Historic Places (NRHP). It is located near the center of Buffalo, near the Old Stone Church which is also NRHP-listed.

It was built in 1916 in Classical Revival style, and was designed and/or built by A.J. O'Shea and Meineke Building Co.

At the time of the listing, the property was owned by the Buffalo Historical Society. The listing included one contributing building.

References

External links

School buildings on the National Register of Historic Places in North Dakota
Neoclassical architecture in North Dakota
School buildings completed in 1916
Schools in Cass County, North Dakota
Defunct schools in North Dakota
National Register of Historic Places in Cass County, North Dakota
1916 establishments in North Dakota